Richard Stevenson Parker Jr. (born June 4, 1952), known professionally as Parker Stevenson, is an American actor best known for playing Frank Hardy in the 1970s series The Hardy Boys and Craig Pomeroy on the 1990s series Baywatch.

Early life
Stevenson was born on the Main Line of Philadelphia, as Richard Stevenson Parker Jr., one of two sons of Richard Stevenson Parker Sr., an investment advisor, and Sarah Meade, an actress who worked on Broadway and in numerous television commercials. His mother took him to a filming session when he was five years old, which resulted in him making two small television appearances. The elder Parker, who had moved his family to Rye, New York, disapproved of the whole business, and although Richard Jr. himself appeared in a few plays at Brooks Preparatory School, he then had no intention of becoming an actor and wanted to be an architect.

Career
Stevenson's first notable screen appearance was a starring role in the 1972 movie A Separate Peace, credited as Parker Stevenson. After graduating from Brooks School and Princeton University, where he studied architecture, he moved to Hollywood and landed a role opposite Sam Elliott in the 1976 film Lifeguard.

Stevenson became well known from starring with teen heartthrob Shaun Cassidy in The Hardy Boys/Nancy Drew Mysteries series, produced by Glen A. Larson's production company through MCA-Universal Television (now NBCUniversal) under license from the Stratemeyer Publication Syndicate, from 1977 to 1979 on ABC. In 1983, he co-starred in the movie Stroker Ace as Burt Reynolds's brash race-car driving nemesis, Aubrey James. The film was a critical and financial failure.

In 1986, Stevenson starred as Billy Hazard in the television miniseries North and South: Book II. He co-starred with then-wife Kirstie Alley, who portrayed his sister Virgilia Hazard. He starred on the short-lived 1988 series Probe in the lead role of Austin James. He was part of the original cast of Baywatch in the 1989 season, returning for the syndicated 1997 and 1998 seasons. He had a recurring role as a computer tycoon on Melrose Place during the second season. He starred in Legion. In 2014, he had a guest role on the Western/mystery series Longmire.

Stevenson has been a photographer since he was young; his work can be found at his photography website.

From 2017 to 2020 he starred on Greenhouse Academy as Louis Osmond, Academy Director.

Personal life
Stevenson was married to his first wife, actress Kirstie Alley, on December 22, 1983, and they divorced in 1997. They adopted two children: a son in 1992 and a daughter in 1995.

Stevenson married celebrity chef Lisa Schoen on September 29, 2018, at the Demetria Vineyards in Los Olivos, California.

Filmography

References

External links

Parker Stevenson ShadowWorks
Interview with Parker Stevenson at Classic Film & TV Cafe

1952 births
20th-century American male actors
21st-century American male actors
American male film actors
American male television actors
American male voice actors
American photographers
Living people
Male actors from Philadelphia
Princeton University alumni
Brooks School alumni